The 2009–10 Central Michigan Chippewas basketball team will represent Central Michigan University in the college basketball season of 2009–10.  The team is coached by Ernie Zeigler and will play their homes game in Rose Arena.

Before the season

Roster Changes
The Chippewas lost two starters from their 2008–09 season.  Marcus Van, who last year led the team with 13.0 points per game and 8.3 rebounds per game, graduated.  The other starter, Jacolby Hardiman was convicted of a high-court misdemeanor and later transferred to Robert Morris University.  Hardiman was responsible for 9.7 points and 4.9 rebounds per game.  The Chippewas also lost six other starters, which included one senior, two sophomores, and three freshmen.  To replace them, the Chippewas are adding five players to their roster.  Two of those are true freshman while the other three are transfers from junior colleges.

Recruiting

Roster
Roster current as of September 15, when their summer prospectus was published.

Coaching staff

Schedule

|- style="background:#f9f9f9;"
| colspan=10 | *Non-Conference Game.  #Rankings from AP Poll.  All times are in Eastern Time Zone.
|}

References

Central Michigan Chippewas
Central Michigan Chippewas men's basketball seasons